Swarthout, also spelled Swartwout and Swartout, is a surname of Dutch origins.  All are descendants from the same lineage. 

Notable people with the surname include:

 Gladys Swarthout (1900–1969), American opera singer
 Glendon Swarthout (1918–1992), American author
 Cornelius Swartwout, holder of first patent for the waffle iron
 David Swartout, golf instructor and coach
 Egerton Swartwout, American architect, Tracy and Swartwout
 Jacobus Swartwout (1734–1827), brigadier general in Revolutionary War, delegate to New York State US Federal Constitution ratification
 Roeloff Swartwout, early American settler, founder of Ulster County, New York
 Robert Swartwout, 9th quartermaster general of the US Army, brigadier general during War of 1812, merchant
 Samuel Swartwout, close supporter of Andrew Jackson, Collector of Customs Port of New York, American soldier
Thomas Samuel Swartwout, early settler and landowner of Peenpack Wagheckemeck Patent, Mamakating precinct, Ulster County, New York precursor of the Town of Deerpark in Orange County, New York
 Tomys Swartwout, early American settler, founder of Midwood, Brooklyn, New York

References